Pavla Šmídová, née Vincourová (born 12 November 1992) is a Czech female volleyball player. She was part of the Czech Republic women's national volleyball team.

She participated in the 2010 FIVB Volleyball Women's World Championship, and in the 2014 FIVB Volleyball World Grand Prix.
She played with Budowlani Łódź.

Clubs
  VK DDM Brno (2005–2007)
  VK Královo Pole Brno (2007–2012)
  VK AGEL Prostějov (2012–2014)
  Pallavolo Scandicci (2014–2015)
  Budowlani Łódź (2015–2016)

References

External links
 Profile at FIVB.org

1992 births
Living people
Czech women's volleyball players
Expatriate volleyball players in Italy
Expatriate volleyball players in Poland
Czech expatriate sportspeople in Italy
Czech expatriate sportspeople in Poland
Setters (volleyball)
Sportspeople from Brno